The 1977–78 Liga Alef season saw Hapoel Tiberias (champions of the North Division) and Hapoel Marmorek (champions of the South Division) win the title and promotion to Liga Artzit.

Second and third placed clubs, Maccabi Herzliya and Hapoel Beit She'an from the North division, with Hapoel Lod and Hapoel Bat Yam from the South division, were also promoted, as both Liga Leumit and Liga Artzit expanded from 14 to 16 clubs each.

North Division

South Division

References
Hapoel Ra'anana escaped relegation to Liga Bet Maariv, 28.5.78, Historical Jewish Press 
Bat Yam played as Liga Artzit club Davar, 28.5.78, Historical Jewish Press 

Liga Alef seasons
Israel
3